Kazimierz Chwalibów Żeromski (died 1662) was Pułkownik of Lithuanian forces during the Battle of Kushliki, where he defeated the first assault of Prince Ivan Andreyevich Khovansky.

References

 Zawistowski, W. (1999). Kto jest kim w Trylogii Henryka Sienkiewicza? (who was who in the "Trilogy" by Henryk Sienkiewicz?) Gdańsk: Tower Press.  

Military personnel of the Polish–Lithuanian Commonwealth
1662 deaths
Year of birth unknown
Place of birth unknown
Date of death unknown
Place of death missing